Ngwaba (also known as Gombi, Goba) is an Afro-Asiatic language spoken in Nigeria in Adamawa State in the Gombi and Hong LGAs.

Notes 

Biu-Mandara languages
Languages of Nigeria